The Yakshagana bells or Yakshagana cymbal are a pair of finger bells made of a special alloy (traditional five metal) used in Yakshagana(Badagu Thittu). They are used by the singer to keep the tempo and rhythm of Yakshagana performance. The pitch of the bells are very high and do not match the tonic of the singer. Due to their high pitch usually singers use bells of any key. Professional singers maintain and treasure their personal finger bells.

Methods of use
Singer holds the thread tied to the bells and hits the edge of one bell to the face of the other bell. There are techniques to produce at least three different sounds. For fast rhythms less prominent hand is rolled to facilitate fast beating. A closed hit of the bells produces a sound without any overtone and with sudden decay. This stroke indicates a gap (husi) and is often used to indicate change in rhythm or tempo to other musicians.

See also

 Tabla
 Thavil
 Karatalas
 Chande
 Tala-Maddale

References

External links
 Yashagana Shruti Box Software Online/WINDOWS/Linux/Mobile/iPhone/Android.

Yakshagana
Carnatic music instruments
Hand drums
Pitched percussion instruments
Indian musical instruments